Verona is a city in Lee County, Mississippi. The population was 2,792 at the 2020 census, down from 3,006 at the 2010 census.

Geography
Verona is located at  (34.188350, -88.718083).

Demographics

2020 census

As of the 2020 United States Census, there were 2,792 people, 1,282 households, and 636 families residing in the city.

2000 census
As of the census of 2000, there were 3,334 people, 1,276 households, and 831 families residing in the city. The population density was 891.4 people per square mile (344.2/km2). There were 1,472 housing units at an average density of 393.6 per square mile (152.0/km2). The racial makeup of the city was 38.78% White, 57.68% African American, 0.42% Native American, 0.33% Asian, 1.65% from other races, and 1.14% from two or more races. Hispanic or Latino of any race were 2.22% of the population.

There were 1,276 households, out of which 37.1% had children under the age of 18 living with them, 36.1% were married couples living together, 22.6% had a female householder with no husband present, and 34.8% were non-families. 28.8% of all households were made up of individuals, and 10.0% had someone living alone who was 65 years of age or older. The average household size was 2.61 and the average family size was 3.22.

In the city, the population was spread out, with 33.1% under the age of 18, 9.5% from 18 to 24, 30.6% from 25 to 44, 17.0% from 45 to 64, and 9.7% who were 65 years of age or older. The median age was 30 years. For every 100 females, there were 91.1 males. For every 100 females age 18 and over, there were 84.4 males.

The median income for a household in the city was $26,117, and the median income for a family was $30,255. Males had a median income of $25,000 versus $18,305 for females. The per capita income for the city was $12,092. About 18.5% of families and 22.2% of the population were below the poverty line, including 29.9% of those under age 18 and 22.6% of those age 65 or over.

Education
Verona is served by the Lee County School District.

Notable people
 Roddy Burdine, former owner of the now-defunct department store Burdines
 Winfield R. Gaylord, minister and member of the Wisconsin State Senate from 1909 to 1913
 Chester W. Taylor, member of the United States House of Representatives from 1921 to 1923

References

Cities in Mississippi
Cities in Lee County, Mississippi
Cities in Tupelo micropolitan area